First Channel — Education, formerly Second Channel, is a Georgian television channel owned and operated by Georgian Public Broadcasting.

External links
 
 2TV Live

Television stations in Georgia (country)
Television channels and stations established in 1991
Georgian-language television stations
1991 establishments in Georgia (country)